John Henry Graham Cutts (1884 – 7 February 1958), known as Graham Cutts, was a British film director, one of the leading British directors in the 1920s. His fellow director A. V. Bramble believed that Gainsborough Pictures had been built on the back of his work.

His daughter was actress Patricia Cutts (1926–1974). Cutts worked with many leading figures in the UK film and stage world, including Basil Dean, Alfred Hitchcock, Gracie Fields, Ivor Novello, and Noël Coward.

Selected filmography
 The Wonderful Story (1922)
 Cocaine (1922)
 Flames of Passion (1922)
 Woman to Woman (1923) with Alfred Hitchcock as assistant
 The White Shadow (1923) with Hitchcock as assistant
 Paddy the Next Best Thing (1923)
 The Prude's Fall (1924) aka Dangerous Virtue with Hitchcock as assistant
 The Passionate Adventure (1924) with Hitchcock as assistant
 The Rat (1925) based on Ivor Novello play
 Die Prinzessin und der Geiger (UK/Germany, 1925) UK title The Blackguard with Hitchcock as assistant
 The Triumph of the Rat (1926)
 The Sea Urchin (1926)
 Chance the Idol (1927)
 The Rolling Road (1927)
 The Queen Was in the Parlour (1927) based on the Noël Coward play
 God's Clay (1928)
 The Return of the Rat (1929)
 The Sign of Four: Sherlock Holmes' Greatest Case (1932)
 Looking on the Bright Side (1932)
 The Temperance Fête (1932)
 Three Men in a Boat (1933)
 Oh, Daddy! (1935)
 Car of Dreams (1935)
 Aren't Men Beasts! (1937)
 Over She Goes (1938)
 She Couldn't Say No (1939)
 Just William (1940)

Notes

References
 Low, Racheal. The History of British Film: Volume IV, 1918–1929. Routledge, 1997.

External links

Graham Cutts at BFI's Screenonline

1884 births
1958 deaths
English film directors
People from Brighton